Kate Bush is an eponymous five-song 12" EP. It was released by EMI America in the United States to promote Kate Bush, who was relatively unknown there at that time. The EP was also released in Canada where she was well known, but with an extra song.

The cover depicts Bush in the warrior costume she sports during the music video for one of the tracks, "Babooshka."

Bush commented on the release: "Quite honestly, I don't think I would have chosen those five. It has very much to do with the record company and what they see a market for. I did want Sat In Your Lap to be on there. It's also quite nice to get the French song on there 'cause I quite like that".

Track listing

References

Kate Bush albums
1983 EPs
Albums produced by Jon Kelly
EMI Records EPs
Art rock EPs
Art rock albums by English artists
Art pop albums
Progressive pop albums
EMI America Records albums